An election to the Islamic City Council of Tehran took place on 15 December 2006, along with the local elections nationwide.

The council is elected by the plurality-at-large voting system. The Principlists gained 10 seats, while the Reformists won 4. Another seat went to Alireza Dabir who ran as an Independent, but was close to then mayor Mohammad Bagher Ghalibaf.

Results

References

Tehran
2006
2000s in Iran